Rivula is a genus of moths in the family Erebidae described by Achille Guenée in 1845.

Description
Palpi porrect (extending forward), the second joint thickly scaled, and third joint minute. A sharp front tuft present. Antennae minutely ciliated. Thorax and abdomen smoothly scaled. The typical section has the tibia of the male nearly naked. Forewings with nearly rectangular apex. Veins 7, 8 and 9 stalked. Hindwings with stalked veins 3 and 4.

Species

References

External links

Rebel (1912). Iris 26: 70, fig. 3.
Scopoli (1763). Entomologia Carniolica.

Rivulinae
Moth genera